Transa is the sixth album by the Brazilian musician Caetano Veloso, released in 1972 by Philips Records. Like its predecessor, it was recorded while the artist was exiled in London, though he returned to Brazil shortly after completing it.

Background and Recording
Exiled in London since 1969, Caetano Veloso gained permissions to stay one month in Brazil in January 1971 to see the commemorative mass of his parents 40th anniversary. In Rio de Janeiro, the singer was interrogated by the military who asked him to compose a song complimenting the Transamazônica highway - during its construction. Caetano didn't accept the "proposal", but, back in London, recorded the LP with the title "Transa", released in Brazilian territory in January 1972, when the singer returned to the country for good.

Reception

Caetano calls it "one of my favorite records", feeling that it reaches a level of musicianship he was unable to achieve on previous albums. It also proved popular with the Brazilian public, due partly to its inclusion of a new version of the old samba "Mora na Filosofia", originally by Monsueto Menezes. It was listed by Rolling Stone Brazil as one of the 10 best Brazilian albums in history. Its success would set up the failure of the much more unconventional follow-up, Araçá Azul. In August 2016, Pitchfork elected "You Don't Know Me" as the 73rd best song from the seventies. Journalist Kevin Lozano writes:

Track listing

Personnel
Adapted from sources.
Caetano Veloso - guitar, vocals
 Jards Macalé - guitar, musical direction
Moacir Albuquerque - bass
Tuti Moreno - percussion
Áureo de Sousa - percussion
Angela Ro Ro - harmonica

References

1972 albums
Caetano Veloso albums
PolyGram albums